Sidney James Plowman (13 December 1934 – 3 May 2007) was an Australian politician. A Liberal Party member of the Victorian Legislative Assembly, Plowman was Speaker of the Assembly on two occasions, from 1979 to 1982 and from 1996 to 1999.

Early life
Plowman was born in Melbourne to Dr Sidney Plowman of Frankston and his wife Marjorie. He was educated at Geelong Grammar School, after which he was an executive trainee at a civil engineering company in Melbourne. After his national service, he moved to Papua New Guinea, where he worked on a coffee plantation and in a timber milling company. He served in the Papua New Guinea Volunteer Rifles, a battalion of Australia's Citizens Military Forces, from 1957 to 1959.

Upon his return to Australia, he worked as a jackaroo in Queensland and New South Wales. He was appointed as overseer of the "Nareen" property in Western Victoria, then owned by future Prime Minister Malcolm Fraser. He managed his own family's property at Benalla, before moving to Glenburn in 1964.

Political career
In 1959, Plowman had joined the Benalla branch of the Liberal Party. He entered politics as a councillor on the Yea Shire Council in 1970, also marrying Prudence Manifold that year. Three years later, he was elected to state parliament as member of the Legislative Assembly for Evelyn. In 1979, he was elected Speaker of the Assembly, aged 44, he was the youngest Speaker up to that time. Plowman lost his seat at the 1982 state election, and returned to farming for a time until regaining Evelyn in 1985.

When the Liberals won government under Jeff Kennett in 1992, Plowman became  Minister for Energy and Minerals (a portfolio he had held in Kennett's shadow cabinet) and Minister Assisting the Treasurer on State Owned Enterprises. He lost the ministry in a 1996 reshuffle, but was elected Speaker for a second time in May 1996, and served as such until his retirement in 1999.

References

|-

1934 births
2007 deaths
Speakers of the Victorian Legislative Assembly
Members of the Victorian Legislative Assembly
Liberal Party of Australia members of the Parliament of Victoria
Victoria (Australia) local councillors
Australian Army soldiers
Australian pastoralists
People educated at Geelong Grammar School
Recipients of the Centenary Medal
20th-century Australian politicians
Politicians from Melbourne
Military personnel from Victoria (Australia)